is a 1992 Japanese anime television series produced by Tatsunoko Production and Sotsu Agency. The series was directed by Hiroshi Negishi and written by Mayori Sekijima and Satoru Akahori. The story follows an organization called the Space Knights and their war against aliens known as the Radam. The Space Knights are assisted by Takaya Aiba, who has the ability to transform into an armored warrior known as Tekkaman Blade.

The first series, of 50 episodes (including episode 0), aired in Japan from February 18, 1992, to February 2, 1993, on TV Tokyo. This was followed by two specials. A sequel series called Tekkaman Blade II, which is set ten years after the first series and follows the events of the second Radam invasion, was a series of six Japanese original video animation (OVA) releases from July 21, 1994, to April 21, 1995. A video game based on the series, titled Uchū no Kishi: Tekkaman Blade, was released in Japan on July 30, 1993. The original series was released internationally, including North America and was dubbed in English as Teknoman. In the English-dubbed versions, the series was heavily cut compared to the original Japanese version and shortened from 50 to 43 episodes.

Plot

Tekkaman Blade
In the United Earth Year 192, Earth is under attack from an alien race known as the Radam, which consists of bug-like monsters and armored warriors known as Tekkamen. The Radam's spaceship lies dormant on the dark side of the Moon where the Radam wait for it to be repaired.

Fighting against the Radam is a special defense force called the Space Knights. The group consists of Heinrich von Freeman, the group's commander; Noal Vereuse, the pilot of the Space Knights' ship Blue Earth; Aki Kirasagi, the Blue Earths navigator; Milly, the communications operator; Levin, a computer mechanic; and Honda, the group's mechanic.

Before the start of the Radam invasion, the exploration ship Argos discovered the dormant Radam spaceship in the outer rings of Saturn. While exploring the ship, the crew were captured by pods and converted into Tekkamen. Before he was fully converted, Takaya Aiba (Tekkaman Blade) was freed by his father and placed into an escape pod; his father then activated the Argos self-destruct. The Radam crashed on the Moon and began their attacks on Earth.

After spending six months drifting toward Earth, Blade bursts free from his escape pod and attacks the Radam forces, entering into a fight with Tekkaman Dagger (Fritz von Braun). After the fight, Blade crashes on Earth and is found by Noal and Aki, who take him back to their headquarters. Blade is initially hostile towards the Space Knights, but as time progresses, he begins to respect them for their dedication and develops a romantic interest in Aki. With Blade's help, the Space Knights begin to repel the Radam until Blade's transformation crystal is shattered during a battle with Dagger. Levin develops a battle robot named Pegas which houses the shards of Blade's crystal and enables him to transform again. In his first transformation using Pegas, Blade challenges Dagger and kills him.

Meanwhile, Earth's belligerent military leader, General Colbert, becomes obsessed with acquiring the Tekkaman armor for his own use. He attempts to attack the Space Knight's base during an emergency, but is forced to withdraw by order of Earth's president. He later sends in the spy Balzac Asimov, posing as a journalist, to infiltrate the Space Knights. Balzac acquires data on the Tekkaman armor system and Earth's military create their own Tekkamen armor, which are worn by Balzac and Noal. Eventually, General Colbert is killed by Blade when he tries to use a weapon that would harm both the Radam and mankind.

Four more Tekkamen — Tekkaman Lance (Molotov), Tekkaman Axe (Goddard), Tekkaman Sword (Hun-Ri) and Tekkaman Evil (Takaya's twin brother Shinya) — arrive on Earth to challenge Blade. Tekkaman Rapier (Takaya's younger sister Miyuki) also arrives on Earth, but like Blade she is not under the Radam's control. Evil, Lance, Axe, and Sword attack the Space Knights' base and attempt to kill Rapier. Although outnumbered, Rapier self-destructs in an attempt to destroy the four Tekkamen. Blade manages to kill Lance and Axe and he later gains the power to attain Blaster Tekkaman mode, although he loses more of his memories whenever he uses it. Evil is given the same ability as the last line of defense for the Radam's leader, Tekkaman Omega.

At the end of the war, Blade and Evil meet for the last time, where Blade kills Evil after a long fight. As he dies, Evil is freed from the Radam's mind control. Balzac kills Sword and they both burn up in Earth's atmosphere.

Blade takes Pegas to the Moon, where he confronts Omega, who reveals that he is Takaya's older brother Kengo. Omega launches the repaired Radam spaceship and heads for Earth. Blade attacks Omega, who easily defeats him. Omega is about to kill Blade when Pegas steps in front of the killing blow and sacrifices itself. Pegas' destruction enrages Blade and causes him to transform into Blaster Tekkaman mode for the last time. Blade kills Omega and causes the Radam spaceship to explode. The remnants of the Radam spaceship fall to Earth along with Blade, now stripped of his armor. As a result, Blade is left reliant on a wheelchair and is completely amnesiac, cared for by Aki.

Tekkaman Blade II
This six-episode series is set ten years after the original series and a new group of Space Knights confront the Radam. The group features Yumi Francois, Aki, Natasha, David and their mysterious leader, D-Boy. Tekkaman Blade joins them to fight the sinister alien enemy, but things become complicated by the appearance of Dead End. He blames the Space Knights for the destruction of the Tekk-plant at Prague after it was conquered by revolutionary generic Tekkamen. 
See individual episode summaries below.

Production

The series itself was conceived as being a re-imagining of the 1975 anime, Tekkaman: The Space Knight which was also by Tatsunoko Production.
During production, the show was initially called "Space Knight Tekkaman Cyber", and even when it was announced in anime magazines, it was tentatively called "Tekkaman Cyber". The planning for the series was done by Kouki Narishima and Mitsushige Inagaki while Motoki Ueda would serve as producer on Tatsunoko's behalf. The series' main sponsor which was Bandai's hobby division wanted a series that had a lot of name recognition, so Tekkaman: The Space Knight was ultimately chosen amongst other works that Tatsunoko owned. Other potential candidates such as Science Ninja Team Gatchaman were suggested, but Tekkaman was chosen because Gatchaman proved difficult to make into model kits and Ueda himself was more of a fan of the original Tekkaman. Initial plans for the plot were to have the main protagonist's family members becoming his enemies, but was later changed to have his brother be his enemy. This plot point was taken from a prior Tatsunoko anime which Ueda previously produced being Legend of Heavenly Sphere Shurato, in which the main character fought against his best friend who was brainwashed by the main antagonists. Coincidentally, Takehito Koyasu, who voiced Gai in Shurato, would later voice Shinya Aiba in this series. In another coincidence, Shurato had armor that was white and red, while Gai sported a set of black and red armor, which likely influenced Blade and Evil's color schemes in the final product. Shurato proved to be popular with female viewers, but the plastic model sales were not, so this series was created for males with model kits in mind, and the only element that would appeal to females was Shinya.

Character designs were done by Hirotoshi Sano and Tomonori Kogawa (credited under the name TOIIIO in the opening and end credits), however, due to a busy schedule, Sano was only able to draw the main protagonist, heroine, and three female characters. Kogawa was originally requested to join as a director, but when he was invited, he was asked not only to direct but also to design and thus drew the remaining characters in place of Sano. Kogawa was also involved in the series as an animation director under the pseudonym Aiba Kouu.

Yutaka Izubuchi was originally going to provide the Tekkaman designs, but due to him also being busy, he was only able to draw a couple of rough design sketches. The rough designs were then done by Yoshinori Sayama, an apprentice of Izubuchi's who had been working with Izubuchi to help make design materials to present to the series' sponsors and producers. When Ueda saw the rough designs, he was convinced that Sayama could do it, but Bandai couldn't decide whether they could sell the designs or not, so a competition was held among more than a dozen designers, which Sayama ultimately won. Sayama was not familiar with the original Tekkaman's design, but Ueda suggested that he work on it without looking at the original design, and would only gave him his impressions. Finally, Kaoru Wada, who was the composer, was told that he did not need to be familiar with the music from the original Tekkaman when composing the series' score.

Episodes

Tekkaman Blade

Tekkaman Blade was broadcast in Japan on TV Tokyo and 50 episodes were aired between February 18, 1992, and February 2, 1993. It uses four pieces of theme music: two opening themes and two ending themes. The first opening theme is "Reason" by Yumiko Kosaka, which is used from the first through twenty-seventh episodes. The first and second ending themes are "Energy of Love" and "Lonely Heart" respectively, both performed by Kosaka.

In 1995, the series was dubbed in English by Saban Entertainment for UPN Kids, under the name Teknoman. Their dub featured a new theme song and background score by Ron Wasserman (Mighty Morphin Power Rangers, X-Men, Dragon Ball Z). The American broadcast version was heavily cut compared to the original Japanese version and shortened from 50 episodes to 43. Saban's dub also aired in Australia during 1995 and 1997, on Network Ten's Cheez TV morning cartoon block.

The series was licensed by Media Blasters Entertainment, through its AnimeWorks label in 2006, with separate boxsets for Teknoman and Tekkaman Blade.

The rights to the edited Saban/UPN Kids TV dub version of Teknoman was owned by Disney Enterprises thru BVS Entertainment, after Disney acquired the Fox Family/Fox Kids Worldwide franchise in 2001, while Media Blasters/AnimeWorks owns the rights to the International dub of Teknoman in 2006, after they released this dub, along with the uncut Tekkaman Blade on Region 1 DVD.

The character names were altered for the English-dubbed Teknoman release: Blade's "D-Boy" nickname was dropped in favor of "Blade" (in the edited UPN TV version, it was changed to "Slade") and his full name "Takaya Aiba" became "Nick Carter". Similarly, "Commander Heinrich von Freeman" became "Commander Jamison", "Noel" became "Ringo Richards", "Aki" became "Star Summers", "Milly" became "Tina Corman", "Levin" (an effeminate male in the original Japanese version) became the female "Maggie Matheson", "Honda" became "Mack", and "Miyuki" became "Shara". The "Radam" were now called "Venemoids" and their leader "Omega" became "Darkon".

In January 2016, the series was released as a remastered Blu-Ray boxset in Japan. The set contains all 50 episodes of the first series and all 6 episodes of the second series, as well as the OVA specials from the laserdiscs, an unreleased episode entitled "Virgin Memory", and a new video interview with Toshiyuki Morikawa.

Specials
These OVA specials were originally included in the Crystal Box laserdisc set and later included as special features for the DVD and Blu-Ray releases.

Tekkaman Blade II
 is a six-episode original video animation (OVA) that was released in 1994 by Tatsunoko and serves as a sequel to the Tekkaman Blade anime series. The series was originally licensed by Urban Vision on VHS in 1998 and later released on DVD in 2001, before later being picked up by Discotek Media in 2012 for an uncut home-media release on DVD and Blu-Ray format, with English dubbing and subtitles as options. The series aired on Starz Encore's Action Anime programming block in 1999.

Merchandise and other media

Merchandise
Model kits based on the series released in Japan by Bandai throughout the show's run, as well as model kits by B-Club, who also made models of the second series. Various Tekkaman Blade action figures have been made over the years, such as Tekkaman Blade and Tekkaman Evil receiving Figmas by Max Factory, a figure of Tekkaman Blade and Pegas was released by Bandai, as well as Bandai also making figure of the series under their Armor Plus line and more recently, Tekkaman Blade received a Riobot figure from Sentinel Toys, with Tekkaman Evil set to receive a Riobot figure at a later date.

Video games
In 1993, BEC published a video game based on the first anime for the Super Famicom (SNES) in Japan. The game has Blade going through various levels in a shoot-em-up-like style where Blade uses his Tek-Lancer to attack, while the boss battles (save for the last fight against Tekkaman Omega) have a 2D fighting game like approach to them. In the year prior, another game which published by Yutaka was a platformer for the Game Boy. In 1994, a real time strategy game based on the first series and sequel OVA for NEC's PC-9801 entitled Tekkaman Blade: Orbital Ring Dakkai Sakusen was released. The game was published and developed by Matrix.

In 2005, Tekkaman Blade debuted in Super Robot Wars J for the Game Boy Advance, an entry in the long-running Super Robot Wars series of crossover strategy RPGs involving various mecha franchises. However, its inclusion in the game caused controversy amongst fans as the show itself has only one proper robot in Pegas, while the title character and a majority of the cast don powered armor to do battle. The first series would later return in 2007's Super Robot Wars W while also featuring the second series, the latter of which made its SRW debut.

Tekkaman Blade would be featured as a playable character in 2010's Tatsunoko vs. Capcom: Ultimate All-Stars for the Wii as one of the five new characters added to the game's roster. In addition, Tekkaman Evil was also planned to appear in the game's roster, but was ultimately scrapped from the final game.

On November 26, 2021, the series was announced to be making a collaboration with the game Iron Saga, a mecha crossover game for mobile devices.

See also
 Tekkaman: The Space Knight

References

External links
 Space Knight: Tekkaman Blade
 Tekno-Mania
 

1992 anime television series debuts
Alien invasions in television
Japanese children's animated space adventure television series
Japanese children's animated science fiction television series
Japanese children's animated superhero television series
Adventure anime and manga
Discotek Media
Drama anime and manga
Mecha anime and manga
Mystery anime and manga
Romance anime and manga
Superheroes in anime and manga
Tatsunoko Production
Television series by Saban Entertainment
Transforming heroes
TV Tokyo original programming